Owiny Ki-Bul (Acholi: "sound of the drums") is a village in the state of East Equatoria in South Sudan. It is located about 200 km south of the regional capital, Juba.  The village consists of several dozen thatched-roof huts.

Owiny Ki-Bul is, along with Ri-Kwangba, one of two assembly points for the rebels of the Lord's Resistance Army (LRA) under the Cessation of Hostilities Agreement agreed to by the LRA and the government of Uganda on 26 August 2006.

External links 
 UGANDA-SUDAN: Waiting in vain for rebels, IRIN, 5 October 2006

Populated places in Eastern Equatoria
Lord's Resistance Army